Candidal intertrigo is an infection of the skin by Candida albicans, more specifically located between intertriginous folds of adjacent skin.

See also 
 Candidiasis
 Intertrigo
 Skin lesion

References 

Mycosis-related cutaneous conditions